DFG may refer to:

Companies
Dollar Financial Group, US
Dongfeng Motor Group, a Chinese carmaker

Education
 several Deutsch-Französische Gymnasien, French-Germans schools
Deutsch-Französisches Gymnasium Saarbrücken (DFG LFA Saarbrücken), Germany
Deutsch-Französisches Gymnasium Freiburg im Breisgau (DFG LFA Freiburg), Germany
Deutsch-Französisches Gymnasium in Buc (DFG LFA Bus), France
District Factor Group, school district category, New Jersey, US

Organizations
Days for Girls, sanitary protection provider
Deutsche Forschungsgemeinschaft (German Research Foundation), a funding organisation
Deutsche Friedensgesellschaft (German Peace Society)

Other uses
Defeated Former Guy, usually in reference to DJT. 
Deaf Frat Guy, a character from the Adam Carolla Show
Department of Fish and Game, now California Department of Fish and Wildlife
Difference-frequency generation, nonlinear optics frequency mixing
Disabled Facilities Grants, UK